"Heart Shaker" is a song recorded by South Korean girl group Twice. It was released by JYP Entertainment on December 11, 2017, as the lead single from the group's reissue of their first studio album, Twicetagram.

Background and release
JYP Entertainment first teased "Heart Shaker" in the music video for "Likey". The words "Heart Shaker" were written on a street advertisement and an arch in the music video. The official Instagram post for "Likey" was also tagged with "#HeartShaker". On November 27, 2017, JYP Entertainment announced the release of the Christmas-inspired reissue of Twice's first full-length album Twicetagram, titled Merry & Happy, on December 11. The lead single "Heart Shaker" was revealed three days later. From December 4–11, several previews and teasers, including the song's lyrics, were released. The album, along with the music video for the lead single, was officially released on December 11. It was also released as a digital download on various music sites.

Composition

"Heart Shaker" is written by music production team called Galactika and co-composed by David Amber and Sean Alexander.

Tamar Herman from Billboard described the song as a "bright pop song [that] incorporates funky guitar riffs, twinkling synths, and soft harmonizing to create a vintage wintertime feel, but with an upbeat melody and impish delivery of the verses and the energetic chorus". Lyrically, the song is about a girl building up the courage to confess her love to the one who has "shaken" her heart.

Commercial performance
The song debuted atop Gaon's Digital Chart and Billboard Korea'''s Kpop Hot 100. It also peaked at No. 2 and 4 on Billboard charts' World Digital Song Sales and Billboard Japan Hot 100, respectively. "Heart Shaker" surpassed 100 million streams in September 2019 and 2,500,000 downloads in March 2020 on Gaon Music Chart.

Music video and promotion
A minute-long music video teaser for "Heart Shaker" was released on December 4, 2017. It features Twice in white long-sleeved T-shirts and jeans performing the chorus of the song on a set that looks like a store. Along with the album release, full version of the heart-themed music video was uploaded online on December 11. Unlike their previous Korean singles, it is heavily dance-oriented in variety of vibrant and retro-inspired sets. It ended with doubling the members in a finale dance sequence that offers up an eighteen-member Twice through mirrored choreography. On January 22, 2018, it surpassed 100 million views, 41 days after the video was uploaded on YouTube. It surpassed 200 million views on July 11, becoming Twice's fifth music video to achieve this. On December 10, 2021, the music had gained 400 million views on YouTube, becoming their seventh music video to do so.

On December 11, 2017, Twice had a live broadcast on Naver V Live to celebrate the album release. They also unveiled the full choreography of "Heart Shaker". Three days later, the group also attended SBS Love FM's Family Concert, where they performed the song live for the first time. Twice then performed "Heart Shaker" on music programs—Music Bank, Show! Music Core and Inkigayo on December 15, 16, 17, respectively.

Japanese version
Twice's second compilation album #Twice2'', released on March 6, 2019, includes both Korean and Japanese-language versions of "Heart Shaker". The Japanese lyrics were written by Risa Horie, Na.Zu.Na and Yu-ki Kokubo.

Accolades

Charts

Weekly charts

Year-end charts

Certifications

See also
List of Gaon Digital Chart number ones of 2017
List of Kpop Hot 100 number ones

References

2017 singles
2017 songs
Korean-language songs
Twice (group) songs
JYP Entertainment singles
Gaon Digital Chart number-one singles
Billboard Korea K-Pop number-one singles
Songs written by Sean Alexander